The southern antpipit (Corythopis delalandi) is a species of bird in the family Tyrannidae, the tyrant flycatchers. It is one of two species in the genus Corythopis. It is found in southern Brazil and the pantanal of Paraguay, Bolivia and Brazil; also extreme north-eastern Argentina. Its natural habitat is subtropical or tropical moist lowland forests.

Distribution

Range: Pantanal, Cerrado and southeast Brazil

The range of the southern antpipit is a 3200 km by 3000 km contiguous area of southern Brazil bordered on the west by the pantanal and the southern cerrado. The range covers extreme eastern Bolivia, and extends eastward including the eastern half of Paraguay with the northeast tongue region of Argentina.

Coastal ranges on the southern Atlantic extend from central Rio de Janeiro south to central São Paulo.

There is no intersecting in the northern or western Cerrado with its other Corythopis species, the ringed antpipit, though its range extends upstream in the southern Amazon Basin into the northwestern Cerrado.

References

External links
 FAUNA Paraguay A complete online guide to Paraguayan fauna
Southern antpipit photo gallery VIREO Photo-High Res--(Close-up)

Corythopis
Birds of the Pantanal
Birds of the Cerrado
Birds of Brazil
Birds of Bolivia
Birds of Paraguay
Birds of Argentina
Birds described in 1831
Taxonomy articles created by Polbot